John Wooster Dean (born John H. Donovan, 1874 – June 23, 1950), also known as Jack Dean,  was an American actor of stage and film. He married actress Fannie Ward after her divorce from her first husband, and co-starred with her in several films. He was born in Bridgeport, Connecticut in 1874 or Washington in 1875. He died of a heart attack in New York City at his Park Avenue home in 1950.

Filmography
The Cheat (1915 film)
The Marriage of Kitty (1915)
The Years of the Locust (1916)
Witchcraft (1916 film)
Each Pearl a Tear (1916)
A Gutter Magdalene (1916)
For the Defense (1916)
Tennessee's Pardner (1916)
Betty to the Rescue (1917)
The Winning of Sally Temple (1917)
On the Level (1917 film)
The Crystal Gazer (1917)
Her Strange Wedding (1917)
Unconquered (1917 film)
A School for Husbands (1917)
Sealed Hearts (1919)

References

External links

1874 births
1950 deaths
20th-century American male actors
Male actors from New York City